The Treaty of Lodi, or Peace of Lodi, was a peace agreement between Milan, Naples and Florence that was signed on 9 April 1454 at Lodi in Lombardy, on the banks of the Adda. It put an end to the Wars in Lombardy between expansive Milan, under Filippo Maria Visconti, and Venice, in the terraferma. They had produced a single decisive Venetian victory, at the Battle of Maclodio in 1427 in which the Venetian ally was Florence but had resulted in no lasting peace. After a further generation of intermittent seasonal campaigning, the Treaty of Lodi established permanent boundaries between Milanese and Venetian territories in Northern Italy, along the river Adda. Francesco Sforza was confirmed as the rightful duke of Milan. A principle of a balance of power in Northern Italy was established, one that excluded ambitions of other powers: the Republic of Genoa, and the princely families of Savoy, Gonzaga and Este.

A related agreement was signed at Venice on 30 August, among Milan, Venice and Florence, which had switched sides, in which the parties bound themselves to principles of non-aggression. The Kingdom of Naples and the other states, including the Papal States, soon joined the Italic League. Thus, the Peace of Lodi brought Milan and Naples into a definitive peace alliance with Florence. Francesco Sforza would base his lifelong external policy on this principle of balance of power. The status quo established at Lodi lasted until 1494, when French troops intruded into Italian affairs under Charles VIII, initiating the Italian Wars.

The Treaty was abrogated in 1483 when Venice and the Pope fought a war against Milan.

It lasted less than 50 years, but some scholars have argued that the treaty provided a proto-Westphalian model of a system between city-states (as opposed to between nation-states) after a century of incessant warfare in Northern Italy. The treaty functioned to institutionalise a regional balance of power in which outright warfare gave way to diplomacy.

See also
List of treaties

Further reading

References

Italian Renaissance
1454 in Europe
1450s treaties
Lodi
Treaties of the Kingdom of Naples
Treaties of the Republic of Florence
15th century in the Kingdom of Naples
15th century in the Republic of Florence